Mian Deh is a village in Badakhshan Province in north-eastern Afghanistan.

See also
Badakhshan Province

References

Populated places in Kuran wa Munjan District